Gerardus Franciscus Amadeus de Bie (16 March 1844 - 25 June 1920) was a Belgian abbot of Bornem Abbey (Common Observance). He became the 74th Abbot-General of the Cistercian Order.

In 1862 he entered Bornem Abbey, and chose his monastic name in honour of Amadeus of Lausanne. In 1895, after the death of Abbot Robertus van Ommeren, de Bie was elected abbot and consecrated by Cardinal Goossens. He served as Abbot of Bornem until 1900, when he was elected abbot general of the Cistercians, in succession to Leopold Wackarž. De Bie's new appointment required that he move to Rome where he lived in a rented apartment. He was succeeded as abbot of Bornem by Thomas Schoen. De Bie served as abbot general throughout the First World War. He died in Rome in 1920.

References

Belgian abbots
People from Bornem
Belgian Cistercians
Cistercian abbots general
Belgian people of World War I
1844 births
1920 deaths